Mads Junker (born 21 April 1981) is a Danish football pundit and former footballer who played as a striker. He played seven matches for the Danish national team.

During his career, and increasingly after his retirement in 2015, Junker worked as a pundit and commentator for DR and TV 2.

Club career
Born in Copenhagen, Junker had his debut in the Danish Superliga in 2000, playing for Lyngby BK while attending High School on the side. Although attracting attention from abroad, he signed with Brøndby IF in December 2001 on a four-year contract. Due to financial difficulties in Lyngby BK he was allowed to leave on a free transfer. Junker was never a great success and was allowed to go on loan to First Division side Ølstykke FC. Junker did not fit into the 4–2–3–1 system favoured by Brøndby manager Michael Laudrup and in 2004 he was sold to FC Nordsjælland.

Nordsjælland
At FC Nordsjælland Junker got off to a flying start, scoring 11 goals in the first half of the season. During the last half, however, he only managed to score twice.

In his second season he was caught red handed cheating his team mates in a series of poker games. In total, Junker swindled his team mates out of 100.000–150.000 DKK. Junker said his desire to win had caused him to use dishonest means, and stated that the incident had taught him a lesson as well as cost a few friendships. As punishment he was replaced as vice-captain by Kim Christensen.

After the gambling incident Junker became increasingly modest, always praising team performance instead of personal ability. Whether this had an influence is unknown, but Junker finally found the stability that had been lacking. Citing the 4–4–2 system and his team as a major factor, Junker scored 15 goals in first half of the season, thus once again attracting attention from abroad.

Vitesse
During the winter break, Junker signed with Eredivisie side Vitesse for a fee of DKK 10 million as a replacement for Matthew Amoah. He made his debut against Feyenoord, but had to be substituted during the second half due to a hip injury. Junker scored his first goal in the home game against SC Heerenveen. In total, he managed 9 goals for Vitesse in the second half of the 2004–05 season.

During his first season in Vitesse, Junker was asked for advice when Vitesse looked into the possibility of signing his former team mate from Nordsjælland, Anders Due. Vitesse signed Due for a fee of DKK 10 million in July 2006.

During the beginning of his second season Junker lost his first team spot to Anduele Pryor. Junker, not happy with the situation, spoke to the media about the possibility of leaving the club. During the winter transfer window, Junker was about to sign with FC Utrecht, but Vitesse cancelled the deal on the last day of the transfer window, as the club feared playing with only three strikers for the rest of the season.

After the end of the 2006–07 season, Utrecht were reportedly still interested, but Vitesse refused to sell the player who was supposed to have a greater role in the upcoming season.

Roda JC
In July 2010, Junker signed with Roda JC. The season before, he had already played for the club on loan, in which he scored 21 league goals in 34 matches.

Mechelen
In June 2012, Junker signed with Belgian club Mechelen.

Delhi Dynamos
In July 2014, Junker signed for the Indian Super League side Delhi Dynamos FC and he wore the No. 9 jersey for the club. Junker made his first appearance in the Indian Super League for Delhi Dynamos FC on 14 October 2014 vs. FC Pune City. He scored his first goal (which was the first headed goal in Indian Super League) against Chennaiyin FC on 25 October at the Jawaharlal Nehru Stadium, New Delhi.

International career
Junker made his first appearance for the Danish national team on 16 August 2006 in the friendly against Poland, when he replaced Nicklas Bendtner in the 67' minute. Before this he had played 6 games for the U-21 team, 5 games for the U-20 team and 2 games for the U-19 team.

Media career
Junker began working as a football pundit on Danish television during his active career as a player. He became a commentator for TV 2 in 2019 for their new channel, TV 2 Sport X.

International goals
Scores and results list Denmark's goal tally first.

References

External links
Danish national team profile
Voetbal International profile
 Brøndby IF profile

1981 births
Living people
Association football forwards
Danish men's footballers
SfB-Oure FA players
Lyngby Boldklub players
Brøndby IF players
Ølstykke FC players
FC Nordsjælland players
SBV Vitesse players
Roda JC Kerkrade players
Danish Superliga players
Eredivisie players
Danish expatriate men's footballers
Expatriate footballers in the Netherlands
Danish expatriate sportspeople in the Netherlands
K.V. Mechelen players
Expatriate footballers in Belgium
Danish expatriate sportspeople in Belgium
Belgian Pro League players
Denmark international footballers
Denmark under-21 international footballers
Denmark youth international footballers
Fremad Amager players
Danish expatriate sportspeople in India
Danish association football commentators
Footballers from Copenhagen